The 2016 TCR International Series Sakhir round was the first round of the 2016 TCR International Series season. It took place on 2–3 April at the Bahrain International Circuit.

Pepe Oriola won both races, driving a SEAT León TCR.

Ballast
After the Valencia testing session, the Balance of Performance was issued: SEAT León TCRs, Honda Civic TCRs and Volkswagen Golf GTI TCRs were given a +30 kg from the minimum weight of 1285 kg, while Subaru Impreza STi TCR received a -20 kg bonus. No changes for Opel Astra TCRs, Alfa Romeo Giulietta TCRs and SEAT León Cup Racers.

Classification

Qualifying

Notes
 — Jean-Karl Vernay and Stefano Comini's best lap times were deleted for exceeding track limits.

Race 1

Race 2

Notes
 — Aku Pellinen and Maťo Homola were given a 30-second penalty for jumping the start.

Standings after the event

Drivers' Championship standings

Model of the Year standings

Teams' Championship standings

 Note: Only the top five positions are included for both sets of drivers' standings.

References

External links
TCR International Series official website

Sakhir
TCR International Series
Sakhir TCR